
Rawa County is a unit of territorial administration and local government (powiat) in Łódź Voivodeship, central Poland. It came into being on January 1, 1999, as a result of the Polish local government reforms passed in 1998.

As of 2006 its total population is 49,443, out of which the population of Rawa Mazowiecka is 17,643, that of Biała Rawska is 3,182, and the rural population is 28,618.

Neighbouring counties
Rawa County is bordered by Skierniewice County and Żyrardów County to the north, Grójec County to the east, and Tomaszów Mazowiecki County to the south.

Administrative division
The county is subdivided into six gminas (one urban, one urban-rural and four rural). These are listed in the following table, in descending order of population.

References
Polish official population figures 2006

 
Rawa